The McDonnell Douglas MD-94X was a planned propfan-powered airliner, intended to begin production in 1994. Announced in January 1986, the aircraft was to seat between 160 and 180 passengers, possibly using a twin-aisle configuration. An all-new design that was investigated internally since at least 1984, the MD-94X was developed in the mid-1980s to compete with the similar Boeing 7J7. The price of oil would have to be at least US$1.40 per gallon for McDonnell Douglas to build the plane, though. Configuration was similar to the MD-80, but advanced technologies such as canard noseplanes, laminar and turbulent boundary layer control, side-stick flight control (via fiber optics), and aluminum-lithium alloy construction were under consideration. Airline interest in the brand-new propfan technology was weak despite claims of up to a 60% reduction in fuel use, and both aircraft were canceled.

Under development at the same time were two propfan-powered commercial variants of the MD-80. The "MD-91X" would have seated 100-110 and entered service in 1991. The price per engine would have been an estimated US$1.6 million dollars more for the propfans than for the MD-80's Pratt & Whitney JT8D-200 series engines. Existing DC-9s and MD-80s would also have been eligible for an upgrade to the new propfan powerplants. McDonnell Douglas tested General Electric Aviation's unducted fan (UDF) engine on an MD-80 demonstrator aircraft, which made its initial flight on May 19, 1987.

A propfan-powered military variant of the MD-87 or MD-91X, called the P-9D, was also proposed as an anti-submarine warfare (ASW) aircraft. The P-9D was intended for use in the United States Navy's Long Range Air ASW-Capable Aircraft (LRAACA) program, which was to initially replace the existing fleet of 125 Lockheed P-3 Orion aircraft. In October 1988, the Navy selected a derivative of the P-3 Orion (which was later renamed Lockheed P-7A) as the LRAACA aircraft over the P-9D.

Specifications

See also

References

Bibliography

External links

 
 
 
 

Abandoned civil aircraft projects of the United States
MD-094X
Propfan-powered aircraft
Low-wing aircraft
Twin-engined pusher aircraft